Kinango is a settlement and Sub-County in Kenya's Mombasa County.

References 

Kinango, currently a growing town that was started by missionaries and administrative colonial rule

Populated places in Coast Province
Mombasa County